Cleveland Electric may refer to:
Cleveland Electric Company, specialty contractor in Atlanta, Georgia
FirstEnergy, energy company in Ohio